Soledade is a municipality in Rio Grande do Sul, Brazil. The city is nicknamed the Cidade das Pedras Preciosas meaning the City of Precious Stones or Rare Gems. Much of the amethyst sold in the world comes from the mines of Rio Grande do Sul near Soledade.  Most of the factories in Soledade process and sell these stones internationally.  As of 2020, the estimated population was 31,035.

Its other famous export apart from its precious stones, is Fábio Rochemback who played football for Grêmio. 

Another notable citizen was Joaquim Mauricio Cardoso, a lawyer, professor, and politician. He was the governor for the state of Rio Grande do Sul, having a public school in Soledade founded after him.

References

External links
Soledade City Hall 
Site sobre a cidade 

Municipalities in Rio Grande do Sul